Simon Richardson may refer to:

Simon Richardson (English cyclist) (born 1983), English racing cyclist
Simon Richardson (Welsh cyclist) (born 1966), Welsh racing cyclist